Eemil Erholtz is a Finnish ice hockey player who plays for Porin Ässät.

Career 
In 2021 Erholtz signed a 2-year contract to Porin Ässät.

References 

Finnish ice hockey left wingers
Finnish ice hockey right wingers
Ässät players
People from Mikkeli
2000 births
Living people
Sportspeople from South Savo